Zabit Akhmedovich Magomedsharipov (born 1 March 1991) is a Russian former professional mixed martial artist. He fought in the Featherweight division of the Ultimate Fighting Championship (UFC) and Absolute Championship Berkut (ACB), where he was the ACB Featherweight Champion.

Background
Magomedsharipov was born in Khasavyurt, Dagestan ASSR, Soviet Union, on March 1, 1991, of Akhvakh ethnicity. Zabit has a younger brother, Khasan Magomedsharipov, who is also a professional mixed martial artist. He started to train in freestyle wrestling at 10 years and then sanda. In 2003 he joined the Wushu boarding school Pyat Storon Sveta, one of the national academic institutions, where he lived for 10 to 12 years for education and trained martial arts three times per day, training under Gusein Magomaev. In 2012, he made his professional MMA debut. In December 2019, his brother then followed in his footsteps by making his professional MMA debut, since putting together a perfect 5–0 record.

Mixed martial arts career

Early career
Magomedsharipov fought in a handful of different promotions early in his career, amassing a professional record of 6-1 before signing with ACB.

Absolute Championship Berkut
Magomedsharipov went 6–0 in the ACB and was featherweight champion.

Ultimate Fighting Championship

Magomedsharipov signed a four-fight deal with the UFC in May 2017.

Magomedsharipov was expected to face Nick Hein on September 2, 2017, at UFC Fight Night: Struve vs. Volkov. However, Hein pulled out of the fight on August 21 and was replaced by Mike Santiago . Magomedsharipov won the fight via submission rear-naked choke in the second round and was awarded a Performance of the Night bonus.

Magomedsharipov faced promotional newcomer Sheymon Moraes on November 25, 2017, at UFC Fight Night: Bisping vs. Gastelum. He won the fight via submission in the third round. The win also earned Magomedsharipov his second Performance of the Night bonus award.

Magomedsharipov faced Kyle Bochniak on April 7, 2018, at UFC 223. He won the fight by unanimous decision. This win earned him a Fight of the Night bonus. Shortly after the bout, Magomedsharipov signed a new multi-fight contract with UFC.

Magomedsharipov was expected to fight Yair Rodríguez on September 8, 2018, at UFC 228. However, Rodríguez pulled out of the fight on August 23 and was replaced by Brandon Davis. Magomedsharipov won the fight via submission in the second round with a modified kneebar.

Magomedsharipov faced Jeremy Stephens on March 2, 2019, at UFC 235. He won the fight by unanimous decision.

Magomedsharipov was expected to face Calvin Kattar on October 18, 2019, at UFC on ESPN 6. However, Magomedsharipov was removed from the card due to injury on September 13 and the pairing was rescheduled for the following month at UFC on ESPN+ 21.  He won the fight via unanimous decision. This fight earned him the Fight of the Night award.

Magomedsharipov was scheduled to face Yair Rodríguez on August 29, 2020, at UFC Fight Night 175. However, Rodríguez pulled out with an ankle injury.

On April 26, 2021, Magomedsharipov was removed from the UFC official rankings due to inactivity. At the time of removal he was ranked #3. In early June 2021, it was reported that Magomedsharipov was suffering from health issues related to his immune system, which ultimately required career-threatening surgery.

In September 2021, Mark Henry announced that Magomedsharipov would be returning to the UFC soon.

In June 2022, Magomedsharipov notified the UFC that he was retiring from active competition, teasing on social media that he has begun training to be a doctor.

Championships and accomplishments

Mixed martial arts
Ultimate Fighting Championship
Performance of the Night (Two times) 
Fight of the Night (Two times) 
Absolute Championship Berkut
ACB Featherweight Championship (One time)
 One successful title defense
Absolute Championship Berkut Grand-Prix winner
MMADNA.nl
2017 European Newcomer of the Year.
2018 Submission of the Year.
Ariel Helwani's show
Submission of the Year 2018 
World MMA Awards
2018 Submission of the Year vs. Brandon Davis at UFC 228

Sanda
Russian champion (4x)
European champion
World cup winner

Mixed martial arts record

|Win
|align=center|18–1
|Calvin Kattar
| Decision (unanimous)
|UFC Fight Night: Magomedsharipov vs. Kattar 
|
|align=center|3
|align=center|5:00
|Moscow, Russia
|
|-
|Win
|align=center|17–1
|Jeremy Stephens
| Decision (unanimous)
|UFC 235 
|
|align=center|3
|align=center|5:00
|Las Vegas, Nevada, United States
|
|-
|Win
|align=center|16–1
|Brandon Davis
| Submission (Suloev stretch)
|UFC 228
|
|align=center|2
|align=center|4:36
|Dallas, Texas, United States
|
|-
|Win
|align=center|15–1
|Kyle Bochniak
| Decision (unanimous)
|UFC 223
|
|align=center|3
|align=center|5:00
|Brooklyn, New York, United States
|
|-
|Win
|align=center|14–1
|Sheymon Moraes
|Submission (anaconda choke)
|UFC Fight Night: Bisping vs. Gastelum
|
|align=center|3
|align=center|4:30
|Shanghai, China
|
|-
|Win
|align=center|13–1
|Mike Santiago 
|Submission (rear-naked choke)
|UFC Fight Night: Volkov vs. Struve
|
|align=center|2
|align=center|4:22
|Rotterdam, Netherlands
|
|-
|Win
|align=center|12–1
| Valdines Silva
|TKO (punches)
|ACB 45
|
|align=center|1
|align=center|1:54
|Saint Petersburg, Russia
|
|-
|Win
|align=center|11–1
|Sheikh-Magomed Arapkhanov
|KO  (punch)
|ACB 31 
|
|align=center|1
|align=center|4:19
|Grozny, Russia
|
|-
|Win
|align=center|10–1
|Abdul-Rakhman Temirov
|Submission (guillotine choke)
|ACB 24: Grand Prix 2015 Finals Stage 2
|
|align=center|1
|align=center|4:16
|Moscow, Russia
|
|-
|Win
|align=center|9–1
|Mukhamed Kokov
|TKO (arm injury)
|ACB 20
|
|align=center|2
|align=center|3:57
|Sochi, Russia
|
|-
|Win
|align=center|8–1
|Artak Nazaryan
|TKO (retirement)
|ACB 15: Grand Prix 2015 Stage 2
|
|align=center|2
|align=center|4:08
|Nalchik, Russia
|
|-
|Win
|align=center|7–1
|Orudzh Zamanov
|Submission (guillotine choke)
|ACB 11
|
|align=center|2
|align=center|3:46
|Grozny, Russia
|
|-
|Win
|align=center| 6–1
|Sarmat Hodov
| Decision (unanimous)
|Oplot Challenge 88
|
|align=center|2
|align=center|1:11
|Kharkov, Ukraine 
|
|-
|Win
|align=center| 5–1
|Sergei Sokolov
|Submission (triangle choke)
|Fight Nights: Krepost Selection 1
|
|align=center| 2
|align=center| 2:49
|Moscow, Russia
|
|-
|Loss
|align=center| 4–1
|Igor Egorov
|Submission (armbar)
|ProFC 47
|
|align=center| 3
|align=center| 1:27
|Rostov-on-Don, Russia
|
|-
|Win
|align=center| 4–0
|Iftikhor Arbobov
|TKO (doctor stoppage)
|ProFC 44
|
|align=center| 2
|align=center| 5:00
|Chekhov, Russia
|
|-
| Win
|align=center| 3–0
|Abkerim Yunusov
| Submission (rear-naked choke)
|ProFC 42
|
|align=center|2
|align=center|2:42
|Kharkov, Ukraine
|
|-
| Win
|align=center| 2–0
|Timur Bolatov
| Decision (unanimous)
|Liga Kavkaz 2012
|
|align=center|2
|align=center|5:00
|Khasavyurt, Russia
|
|-
| Win
|align=center| 1–0
|Zhumageldy Zhetpisbayev
| TKO (punches)
|Odesa Golden Cup
|
|align=center|3
|align=center|2:45
|Odesa, Ukraine
|
|-

Mixed martial arts amateur record

|-
|Loss
|align=center|0–1
|Rakhman Makhazhiev
|Submission (armbar)
| M-1 Challenge 34
|
|align=center|2
|align=center|4:49
|Moscow, Russia
|
|-

See also

 List of male mixed martial artists

References

External links
Official UFC Profile
 
 

1991 births
Living people
Featherweight mixed martial artists
Dagestani mixed martial artists
Russian male taekwondo practitioners
Russian sanshou practitioners
Russian male mixed martial artists
People from Khasavyurt
Avar people
Ultimate Fighting Championship male fighters
Mixed martial artists utilizing sanshou
Mixed martial artists utilizing taekwondo
Mixed martial artists utilizing freestyle wrestling